Saori Kondo (born 1956) is a former badminton player who won Japanese national titles and excelled internationally in the late 1970s and early 1980s. Known for her quickness and determination, Kondo was runner-up in women's singles at the prestigious All-England Championships in both 1978 and 1979. She performed exceptionally well for the Japanese Uber Cup (women's international) teams, which won consecutive world championships in 1978 and 1981.

References

1956 births
Living people
Japanese female badminton players
Asian Games medalists in badminton
Asian Games bronze medalists for Japan
Badminton players at the 1978 Asian Games
Medalists at the 1978 Asian Games